Roshan Taqui is an Indian historian specialising on Lucknow and its culture.

Personal life 
Roshan Taqui was born in 1958 at Lucknow.

He is an alumnus of AMU and Ph.D from Lucknow University on ‘Lucknow Monuments – Preservation, Conservation Solutions’.

Taqui's great-grandfather and great grand-uncle were killed in Lucknow during the 1857 uprising.

Professional life 
Taqui has written numerous books and published more than 140 research papers on history and cultural heritage of Avadh in English, Hindi and Urdu.

His book Lucknow Ki Bhand Parampara ("The Traditions of the clown of Lucknow") is the only book on the subject. He has also written two books on contribution of rulers of Avadh to Indian music and dance viz., Bani and Chanchal.

He has also written and directed three short films on adult education and prohibition and directed 14 plays.

Roshan Taqui is member secretary of HARCA (the Historical & Archaeological Research and Conservation Agency), which is looking after conservation and restoration of heritage buildings at Lucknow.

Publications

English 

 Avadh Dastavez
Images of Lucknow, 2007, New Royal Book Co. 
 Lucknow 1857: The Two Wars of Lucknow, Dusk of an Era, 2001, New Royal Book Co. 
Lucknow Conservation, International Dimensions
Lucknow Monuments – Conservation, Preservations Solutions
Begum Hazrat Mahal

Hindi 

Bani - Sangeet Sankalan
Lucknow ki Bhand Parampara
Lucknow kay Miraasi
Chanchal - Sangeet Sankalan
Dulhan - Sangeet Sankalan
Sautul Mubarak
Begum Hazrat Mahal
1857 kay Baad Lucknow ki Barbaadi
Aaha Mirza Kambalposh - Lucknow ka Pahla Krantiveer
Wajid Ali Shah - Ek Sufi  ek Sant
Anuvaad - Shad Azimabaadi

Urdu 

 Khushboo - Urdu dramoN ka Majmua
 Ajayab Nagar - Yakbaabi Almiya DramoN ka MajmuaaN
 Daadajaan ne Kaha Tha - Do Baabi Tarbiya DramoN ka MamuaaN

References 

1958 births
20th-century Indian historians
Living people
Indian Muslims
Writers from Lucknow